Frontón is a barrio in the municipality of Ciales, Puerto Rico. Its population in 2010 was 2,228.

Economy
Walmart in Puerto Rico works with USDA-approved businesses located in Frontón, such as Lettufresh, who supply fresh lettuce to Walmart and Amigo Supermarkets.

History
Puerto Rico was ceded by Spain in the aftermath of the Spanish–American War under the terms of the Treaty of Paris of 1898 and became an unincorporated territory of the United States. In 1899, the United States Department of War conducted a census of Puerto Rico finding that the population of Frontón barrio was 3,706.

Frontón saw a 38.9% increase in population from 1990 to 2000 then a 17.0% decrease from 2000 to 2010.

Sectors
Barrios (which are roughly comparable to minor civil divisions) in turn are further subdivided into smaller local populated place areas/units called sectores (sectors in English). The types of sectores may vary, from normally sector to urbanización to reparto to barriada to residencial, among others.

The following sectors are in Frontón barrio:

Gallery

See also

 List of communities in Puerto Rico
 List of barrios and sectors of Ciales, Puerto Rico

References

External links

Barrios of Ciales, Puerto Rico